was a town located in Wake District, Okayama Prefecture, Japan.

As of 2003, the town had an estimated population of 5,254 and a density of 59.27 persons per km2. The total area was 88.65 km2.

On March 22, 2005, Yoshinaga, along with the town of Hinase (also from Wake District), was merged into the expanded city of Bizen.

Dissolved municipalities of Okayama Prefecture
Bizen, Okayama